Shadows of the Dying Sun is the sixth studio album by the Finnish melodic death metal band Insomnium. It was released in North America on April 29, 2014 via Century Media Records, and on April 25 in Finland, Germany, Austria, and Switzerland, the rest of Europe, as well as Australia and New Zealand on April 28. It is their first album with new guitarist Markus Vanhala after previous long-time guitarist Ville Vänni departed in 2011.

The song "Revelation", in the form of a lyric video, was released on March 21, 2014. A music video was made for the song and single "While We Sleep", which was released on April 7, 2014. The last song, "Black Heart Rebellion" was released on April 22, 2014.

Track listing

Personnel
Credits are adapted from the album liner notes.

Insomnium
Niilo Sevänen – lead vocals, bass
Ville Friman – guitars, clean vocals
Markus Vanhala – guitars
Marcus Hirvonen – drums
Additional musicians
Teemu Aalto – backing vocals (on track 2, 5, 7, 9 & 10), additional guitars 
Aleksi Munter – keyboards

Production and design
Teemu Aalto – producer, recording 
Insomnium – producer
Kimmo Perkkiö – recording 
Aleksi Munter & Hannu Honkonen – recording 
André Alvinzi – mixing at Fascination Street Studios
Svante Forsbäck – mastering at Chartmakers
 Wille Naukkarinen – artwork
 Jussi Ratilainen – photography

Charts

References 

2014 albums
Insomnium albums